The 2014 Men's World Floorball Championships were the 10th World Championships in men's floorball. The tournament took place in Gothenburg, Sweden in December 2014. Home team Sweden defended their title in a close game against Finland. Czech Republic earned the bronze after defeating Switzerland by 4–3.

Qualification

For the first time ever, all teams, except from the host country, must qualify for the Championships. A total of 30 teams are scheduled to take part in the qualification tournaments.

Venues

Draw
The final draw for the tournament was held at Casino Cosmopol in Gothenburg on 25 February 2014. The teams were divided into four pots according to the world ranking. (World rankings shown in parentheses).

Results

Preliminary round

Group A

Group B

Group C

Group D

Playoff round

Play-off

Quarterfinals

Semifinals

Bronze medal game

Final

Placement round

13th place bracket

Matches 13th–16th

15th place match

13th place match

9th place bracket

Matches 9th–12th

11th place match

9th place match

5th place bracket

Matches 5th–8th

7th place match

5th place match

Ranking and statistics

Final ranking
The official IFF final ranking of the tournament:

All-star team
Best goalkeeper:  Mike Trolle Wede
Best defenders:  Tatu Väänänen,  Martin Östholm 
Best forwards:  Rasmus Enström,  Jani Kukkola,  Kim Nilsson

References

External links
 Official results

Floorball World Championships
Mens World Floorball
International sports competitions in Gothenburg
2014 in floorball
International floorball competitions hosted by Sweden
2000s in Gothenburg
December 2014 sports events in Europe